Cohoes may refer to:

Cohoes, New York, a city in Albany County, New York, United States
Cohoes Fashions, an American clothing store
USS Cohoes, a list of ships

See also
Cohoe, Alaska, United States